The PSL Reserve League as of 2020 the MultiChoice Diski league is the reserve team league for the top South African football (soccer) teams in the Premier Soccer League. The league was established in February 2007 with eight clubs located in the Gauteng province.

References

Soccer leagues in South Africa
Sou
Premier Soccer League